Flavio Germán Rojas Catalán (born January 16, 1994) is a Chilean footballer who currently plays for Chilean club San Antonio Unido as a central defender.

Career
After staying all his career in Cobresal, also winning the 2015 Torneo Clausura at the Primera División, he joined Coquimbo Unido on 2020 season., where played only one match. So, he joined Primera B club Unión San Felipe on second half 2020.

Honors

Club
Cobresal
 Primera División (1): 2015-C

References

External links
 

Living people
1994 births
Footballers from Santiago
Chilean footballers
Cobresal footballers
Coquimbo Unido footballers
Unión San Felipe footballers
Puerto Montt footballers
San Antonio Unido footballers
Association football defenders
Chilean Primera División players
Primera B de Chile players
Segunda División Profesional de Chile players